Kordell Devone Samuel (born 28 February 1985 in Trinidad and Tobago) is a Trinidadian footballer who last played in the Dhivehi Premier League with T.C. Sports Club.

Career

Professional

Kordell Samuel started his career in the TT Pro League at a young age playing for clubs such as Caledonia AIA, North East Stars, and Joe Public F.C.

In 2012–2013 Samuel signed with PDRM FA in the Malaysia Premier League, and later on transferred to Nakhon Pathom United F.C. for the 2013–2014 season in the Thai Division 1 League.

On 17 January 2015, Samuel signed a 1–year contract with Salvadoran Primera División side, C.D. Pasaquina.

Samuel debuted with C.D. Pasaquina on 24 January 2015, playing 90 minutes in a 0–0 tie vs historic club C.D. FAS at Estadio Oscar Quiteño. He scored his first goal in Pasaquina's jersey in a 1–0 win over Atlético Marte on 18 February 2015 in Pasaquina.

After his first Clausura season in El Salvador, Kordell Samuel transferred to C.D. Chalatenango. He scored his first goal for Chalatenango in a 2–1 home win at the 93rd minute vs C.D. Universidad de El Salvador on 19 September 2015.

Style of play

Samuel is generally deployed as a forward, more often on the wing, and takes a more attacking role than a typical midfielder. He possesses good ball control and dribbling which, coupled with short, fast bursts of pace, lead him to be considered a very direct player. Playing from the left allows him to cut in onto his favored right foot to shoot. In a 4–4–2 formation, Samuel can take on a more central role.

Honours

References

External links
Kordell Samuel at playmakerstats.com (English version of ceroacero.es)

1985 births
Living people
Trinidad and Tobago footballers
Expatriate soccer players in the United States
USL League Two players
Morvant Caledonia United players
North East Stars F.C. players
TT Pro League players
Expatriate footballers in El Salvador
Joe Public F.C. players
Association football forwards